"Oh No, Not You Again" is the third single by Australian rock band Australian Crawl from their 1981 studio album Sirocco. The song was written and sung by Guy McDonough, the band's rhythm guitarist, and was about "two young lovers who lived on the coast" whose relationship is disrupted by the man spending his nights "out on the town". It was produced by Peter Dawkins.

"Oh No Not You Again" was released in November, 1981 and featured a double A-side with "Lakeside".  Despite the song's popularity, it was not featured on either of Australian Crawl's live albums. However, James Reyne did record an acoustic version with a more forlorn tone for his 2005 album And the Horse You Rode in On. The single reached #58 on the Australian Singles Charts in October, 1981.

Track listing
"Oh No Not You Again" (Guy McDonough)
"Lakeside" (James Reyne)

Charts

References

1981 songs
1981 singles
Australian Crawl songs
EMI Records singles
Songs written by Guy McDonough
Song recordings produced by Peter Dawkins (musician)